Richard Alan Williams is an Australian politician. He was a member of the Queensland Legislative Assembly from 2015 until 2017, representing the electorate of Pumicestone. He served for most of his term as a Labor member, but resigned from the party to sit as an independent in October 2017 after being disendorsed as a Labor candidate for the 2017 election. He recontested his seat as an independent, but was unsuccessful.

Williams publicly displayed an anti-abortion stance with regard to reproductive rights, in contrast with the majority of his state ALP colleagues.

On 27 October 2017, Premier Annastacia Palaszczuk instructed the secretary of the state Labor party to disendorse Williams as the party's candidate for the next Queensland state election, following Williams' involvement in a series of controversies regarding his behaviour towards his neighbours and business associates.

References

Year of birth missing (living people)
Living people
Members of the Queensland Legislative Assembly
Australian Labor Party members of the Parliament of Queensland
Independent members of the Parliament of Queensland
21st-century Australian politicians